New York State Route 100C (NY 100C) is an east–west spur route of NY 100 located in Westchester County, New York, in the United States. NY 100C has a junction with the Sprain Brook Parkway near its eastern terminus. The eastern terminus of NY 100C also serves as NY 100A's northern endpoint.

Route description

NY 100C begins at an interchange with NY 9A (Saw Mill River Road) in the town of Greenburgh. The route heads eastward as Grasslands Road, a continuation of County Route 303 (CR 303, an unsigned route) which heads towards the hamlet of Eastview. NY 100C enters a grade-separated interchange shortly after with the Sprain Brook Parkway. A short distance from the interchange, NY 100C intersects with NY 100 (Bradhurst Avenue) and NY 100A (Knollwood Road). This intersection serves as the eastern terminus of NY 100C, as Grasslands Roads continues east as NY 100.

History
All of what is now NY 100C was originally designated as part of NY 142 . At the time, NY 142 overlapped with NY 9A along Old Saw Mill River Road (modern CR 303) to the east end of Neperan Road, where it broke from NY 9A and proceeded toward Hawthorne on then-Saw Mill River Road. The NY 142 designation was short-lived, however, as it was eliminated . By 1940, the portion of NY 142's former routing northeast of the NY 9A overlap was replaced by an extended NY 141 while the section east of the concurrency on Grasslands Road was redesignated as NY 100C. In the late 1940s, NY 9A was extended northward through Hawthorne to Ossining by way of a realigned Saw Mill River Road. The portion of Old Saw Mill River Road between Grasslands Road and the new highway became a short extension of NY 100C.

Major intersections

See also

References

External links

NY 100C (Greater New York Roads)

100C
Transportation in Westchester County, New York